William Lawrence Marven Creaghan (30 May 1922 – 1 October 2008) was a Progressive Conservative party member of the House of Commons of Canada. He was born in Newcastle, New Brunswick and became a barrister and judge by career.

Between 1952 and 1958, Creaghan was a Moncton city alderman at large.

After an unsuccessful attempt to win a Parliamentary seat at New Brunswick's Westmorland riding in the 1957 federal election, Creaghan won the seat in the following year's election. After serving only one term, the 24th Canadian Parliament, Creaghan was defeated in his riding in the 1962 election by Sherwood Rideout of the Liberal 
party.

After leaving federal office, Creaghan was a judge in various New Brunswick courts until his retirement in 1997. He died at Fredericton at age 86.

References

External links
 

1922 births
2008 deaths
Members of the House of Commons of Canada from New Brunswick
Judges in New Brunswick
Lawyers in New Brunswick
Moncton city councillors
Progressive Conservative Party of Canada MPs